İpek Ongun (born 7 January 1942) is a Turkish novelist.

She was born in Ankara on 7 January 1942 to Nusret, an officer in Turkish Army and Fatma, a literature teacher. After graduating from  Arnavutköy American High School for Girls in 1961, she took courses on literary criticism in New York, United States. She began her literary career by writing for Doğan Kardeş, a children's periodical in İstanbul. She also served for Time magazine and Life magazine. As a novelist, she wrote mainly for the juveniles. In 1991, she was awarded a "Golden Book" by the Turkish trade fair organizer TÜYAP. In 1998, she was named as the "Most Successful Author". She is married and mother of two.  Currently she is living in Mersin, her husband's home city.

Novels
Her novels are the following:
Bir Genç Kızın Gizli Defteri – 1 ("Secret Diary of a Young Girl")
Bir Genç Kızın Gizli Defteri – 2 - Arkadaşlar Arasında ("Among the Friends")
Bir Genç Kızın Gizli Defteri – 3 - Kendi Ayakları Üstünde ("On Her Own")
Bir Genç Kızın Gizli Defteri – 4 - Adım Adım Hayata ("Step to Step to Life" )
Bir Genç Kızın Gizli Defteri – 5 – İste Hayat ("That's Life")
Bir Genç Kızın Gizli Defteri – 6 – Şimdi Düğün Zamanı ("Time to Marriage")
Bir Genç Kızın Gizli Defteri – 7 – Hayat Devam Ediyor ("Life is Continuing")
Bir Genç Kızın Gizli Defteri – 8 – Günler Akıp Giderken ("While the Days Pass") 
Bir Genç Kızın Gizli Defteri – 9 – Ya Sen Olmasaydın ("If You wouldn't Exist")
Bir Genç Kızın Gizli Defteri – 10 – Taşlar Yerine Otururken ("While it Falls into Place")
Bir Genç Kızın Gizli Defteri – 11 – Yıllar Sonra ("After the Years")
Yaş On Yedi ("Age Seventeen")
Kamp Arkadaşları ("Camp Friends")
Mektup Arkadaşları ("Pen Pals")
Afacanlar Çetesi ("The Gang of the Little Monsters")
Mayanın Günlüğü – Güzel Bir Gün ("A Fine Day")
Mayanın Günlüğü – İşte Benim Ailem ("That's My Family")
Mayanın Günlüğü – Haydi Tanışalım ("Let's Meet")
Mayanın Günlüğü – Haydi Oyuna ("Let's Play")
Bir Pırıltıdır Yaşamak ("Life is a Glister")
Yarım Elma Gönül Alma ("Half an Apple, Conciliation")
Sabah Pırıltıları ("Morning Glister")
Bu Hayat Sizin ("Life is Yours")
Lütfen Beni Anla ("Please Understand Me")
Duyarlı Davranışlar Yaşama Kültürü Üzerine ("On the Living Culture of Sensitive Behavior")
Yoksa Hayat Gençken Daha mı Zor ("Is the Life More Difficult While Young")

References

Living people
1942 births
People from Ankara
Alumni of Arnavutköy American High School for Girls
People from Mersin
Turkish women novelists